Curtis Pritchard (born 8 February 1996) is an English dancer and choreographer, known for his role as a professional dancer on the Irish version of Dancing with the Stars. In 2019, Pritchard appeared in the fifth series of the British dating reality series Love Island, finishing in fourth place.

Early life 
Pritchard was born on 8 February 1996 in Stoke-on-Trent, England.

Career

Dancing with the Stars
In 2017, Pritchard was announced as one of the professional dancers for the first series of Ireland's Dancing with the Stars. He was partnered with model Thalia Heffernan. They were eliminated in week four of the competition, finishing in tenth place.

In 2018, Pritchard was partnered with businesswoman Norah Casey. On 21 January, Casey and Pritchard became the first couple to be eliminated from the competition.

For the 2019 series, Pritchard was due to be partnered with model Holly Carpenter, but following an attack on 27 December 2018, he was ruled out competing for five weeks. He was replaced by former Strictly Come Dancing professional, Trent Whiddon. In November 2019, Pritchard confirmed that he would not return for a fourth series.

Series 1 (2017)

 Celebrity partner
 Thalia Heffernan; Average: 19; Place: 10th

Series 2 (2018) 

 Celebrity partner
 Norah Casey; Average: 16; Place: 11th

Other ventures
In June 2019, Pritchard began appearing as a contestant on the fifth series of the ITV2 dating reality series Love Island. In July 2019, it was announced that Pritchard, along with his brother AJ, would appear as guest choreographers on the BBC Three reality series RuPaul's Drag Race UK. In December 2019 Pritchard appeared in a TV series alongside his Love Island colleague Tommy Fury called The Boxer and The Ballroom Dance on ITV2 whereby they swapped careers, so Pritchard taking up boxing and Fury trying ballroom dancing. 2020, saw him appear in BBC One's The Greatest Dancer as a receptionist. Later that year, it was announced that he would be starring in Celebs Go Dating: The Mansion. In February 2021, it was announced that Pritchard would be making his acting debut in the Channel 4 soap opera Hollyoaks, alongside his brother. He portrayed the role of Jacob; their acting abilities were the subject of widespread criticism. In 2023, Pritchard competed on the reality-competition series The Challenge UK.

Personal life 
From 2016 Pritchard was in a relationship with fellow Dancing with the Stars professional dancer, Emily Barker. In early 2019 it was reported the couple were no longer an item.

On 27 December 2018, he and his brother AJ, along with two others, were attacked in  an "unprovoked assault" on a night out in Nantwich. He needed an emergency operation to his knee and was unable to appear on Dancing with the Stars. A 20-year-old man was arrested and released.

Pritchard began dating Maura Higgins following their appearance together on Love Island. In March 2020, Higgins confirmed that they had split.

References

External links

1996 births
Living people
British ballroom dancers
Love Island (2015 TV series) contestants
People from Stoke-on-Trent
The Challenge (TV series) contestants